Cairney is a surname. Notable people with the surname include:

Bruce Cairney (b. 1963), martial artist (Townsville Australia)
Gemma Cairney (b. 1985), radio presenter (BBC Radio 1)
Harry Cairney (b. 1961), Scottish footballer (Airdrie, Stenhousemuir, Brechin City)
Jim Cairney (b. 1931), Scottish footballer (York City)
Joe Cairney (1956–2009), Scottish footballer (Airdrie, Kilmarnock)
John Cairney (b. 1930), Scottish actor
John Cairney (anatomist) (1898–1966), New Zealand doctor and writer
Paul Cairney (b. 1987), Scottish footballer (Partick Thistle, Hibernian, Kilmarnock)
Tom Cairney (b. 1991), Scottish footballer (Hull City, Blackburn Rovers, Fulham)
Brandon Cairney (b. 2000), American Sailor (Seattle, Washington)
Lance Cairney (b. 1968), American Ironworker and American college football player at University of Oregon (Portland, Oregon)

See also
 Cairnie, a village in Aberdeenshire, Scotland